WKLW-FM (94.7 FM) is a radio station that was founded in 1993.  It broadcasts a Top 40/CHR format. It is licensed to Paintsville, Kentucky, United States. The station is currently owned by Terry Forcht, through licensee S.I.P. Broadcasting Company, Inc., and is locally programmed. Forcht acquired the station in 2015. The station broadcasts on HD radio. online via Official Stream Page, TuneIn also on Apple and Android mobile devices.

References

External links
Live Stream
Google Play Store App

WKLW Facebook page
WKLW website

KLW-FM
Paintsville, Kentucky
Contemporary hit radio stations in the United States